Christian Schrøder (13 July 1869 – 10 December 1940) was a Danish film actor, screenwriter and director. He was also a captain in the reserve. He appeared in 30 films between 1912 and 1940, mostly farce and comedy. He was born in Middelfart, Denmark, and died in Copenhagen, Denmark.

Selected filmography
 Atlantis (1913)
 Den kulørte Slavehandler (1914)
 The Joker (1928)
 I kantonnement (1932)
 Han, hun og Hamlet (1932)
 Københavnere (1933)
 Ud i den kolde sne (1934)
 Kidnapped (1935)
 Prisoner Number One (1935)
 Week-end (1935)
 Unfriendly Relations (1936)
 Conscientious Objector Adolf (1936)
 I de gode, gamle dage (1940)

External links

References 

1869 births
1940 deaths
People from Middelfart Municipality
Danish male film actors
Danish male silent film actors
20th-century Danish male actors